The 2011 edition of the Belau Games was the first in which football was played. The tournament ran from 17 to 18 July 2011 and featured four teams from Palau. The teams that entered were not actual football clubs from Palau, but were instead teams representing four of the sixteen states of Palau.

The tournament featured a group stage which would determine which teams played each other in the semi-finals.

Ngeremlengui were the eventual winners, beating Airai 6-0 in the Gold-medal match.

Entered Teams

Teams representing the following four states entered the tournament:
Airai
Koror
Ngardmau
Ngeremlengui

Group stage
The group stage matches were played from 17–18 July. The matches would determine whether each team would be in semi-final 1 or 2.

Standings

Results

Knockout stage

note 1: The third place play-off is the Bronze-medal match.
note 2: The final is the Gold-medal match.

Semi finals
All four teams qualified from the group stage, which was played simply to decide which teams would be in which semi-final. The semis both took place on 18 July.

Bronze-medal match
The Bronze-medal match (third place play-off) was played between the two losing semi-finalists on 18 July.

Gold-medal match
The Gold-medal match (the final) was played between the two semi final winners on 18 July. This would decide which team would win Gold, and which would win Silver.

Final ranking

See also
Belau Games
2011 Belau Games
Football in Palau

External links
Palau Soccer Association - Homepage
Football at the 2011 (8th) Belau Games - Results 

Belau
Soccer